Gündüzler   is a village in Silifke district of Mersin Province, Turkey. The village is situated on the Taurus Mountains. The population of Gündüzler was 251 as of 2012.

References

Villages in Silifke District